Mary Traill Spence Lowell Putnam (December 3, 1810 – June 1, 1898) was an American author. She was the sister of James Russell Lowell, and the daughter of Rev. Charles Lowell. She had an aptitude for acquiring languages:  she was eventually fluent in French, Italian, German, Polish, Swedish and Hungarian, and familiar with many other languages. She married Samuel R. Putnam in 1832 and later traveled abroad for several years.

Putnam's literary work was confined to magazine writing until 1844, when she translated from the Swedish Fredrika Bremer's The Handmaid. She contributed to the North American Review articles on Polish and Hungarian literature (1848–1850), and to the Christian Examiner on the history of Hungary (1850–1851). Her name became widely known when she became involved in a controversy with Francis Bowen, editor of the North American Review, regarding the war in Hungary. Bowen attacked the Hungarian revolutionists, whom she upheld.


Works
 History of the Constitution of Hungary, published the year before the 1851 visit of Louis Kossuth to the United States (1850)
 Record of an Obscure Man, a novel, published anonymously (1861)
 The Tragedy of Errors and The Tragedy of Success, a dramatic poem in two parts on slavery in the southern United States (1862)
 Memoir of William Lowell Putnam, on her son (1840-1861), who died at Ball's Bluff in the Civil War (1862)
 Fifteen Days (1866)
 Memoir of Charles Lowell, her father (1885)

Notes

References

  The work credits her with a translation of The Neighbors rather than The Handmaid.

External links
 

1810 births
1898 deaths
19th-century American poets
19th-century American women writers
19th-century American translators
Writers from Boston
American women poets